The 2018 Albany Great Danes football team represented the University at Albany, SUNY in the 2018 NCAA Division I FCS football season. They were led by Greg Gattuso, who was in his fifth season as head coach, and played their home games at Bob Ford Field at Tom & Mary Casey Stadium. The Great Danes played as members of the Colonial Athletic Association for the fifth season. They finished the season 3–8, 1–7 in CAA play to finish in last place.

Previous season
The Great Danes finished the 2017 season 4–7, 2–6 in CAA play to finish in a tie for tenth place.

Preseason

CAA Poll
In the CAA preseason poll released on July 24, 2018, the Great Danes were predicted to finish in ninth place.

Preseason All-CAA Team
The Great Danes had one player selected to the preseason all-CAA team.

Special teams

Donovan McDonald – PR

Schedule

Source:

Game summaries

at Pittsburgh

at Rhode Island

Morgan State

Saint Francis (PA)

at William & Mary

Richmond

Towson

at Maine

Delaware

at New Hampshire

Stony Brook

References

Albany
Albany Great Danes football seasons
Albany Great Danes football